The Monastery of San Vicente do Pino is a former monastery in Monforte de Lemos, Galicia, Spain. It currently houses a parador.

Gallery

Paradores
Monasteries in Galicia (Spain)
Monforte de Lemos